Claygate Common is a   Local Nature Reserve south-east of Esher in Surrey. It is owned and managed by Elmbridge Borough Council.

The common is woodland with oak, beech and hornbeam. It has birds such as kestrels, green woodpeckers and sparrowhawks.

References

Local Nature Reserves in Surrey